 
Toppesfield is a village and civil parish in the Braintree district of Essex, England. The parish contains the hamlets of Gainsford End and Grass Green.

History
The derivation of the name 'Toppesfield' is 'open land on the hill top', a possible agglomeration of the phrase 'Top of the Field'.

Geography
Toppesfield,  from the Suffolk border, is part of North Essex which has higher terrain than most of Essex. The village sits on a small and shallow hill, about 75 metres above sea level.

Community
Toppesfield is a rural community historically associated with arable farming. The village has approximately 300 inhabitants.

Toppesfield's only public house is the Green Man. The pub is owned by Toppesfield Community Pub Limited (TCP), an Industrial & Provident Society which was established in 2012.  TCP gained control of the Green Man in December 2012 from Admiral Taverns, a national pub chain which had financial problems. TCP is owned by more than 150 shareholders who raised share capital exceeding £150,000 to help finance the purchase.

St Margaret’s Church, Topplesfield, a Church of England parish church, is part of the Upper Colne Valley Parishes joint benefice. Affiliated to the church is St Margaret's Church of England primary school.

The church has a ring of 8 bells. https://dove.cccbr.org.uk/detail.php?tower=10568

During the 1980's, several championship games of "Shed and Gate" were played at St Margaret's school.

References

External links

St Margaret's C of E Primary School

Villages in Essex
Braintree District